Volleyball events were contested at the 1985 Summer Universiade in Kobe, Japan.

References
 Universiade volleyball medalists on HickokSports

U
1985 Summer Universiade
Volleyball at the Summer Universiade